Jean Metellus (30 April 1937 - 4 January 2014)  was a Haitian neurologist, poet, novelist and playwright.

Life and career
Jean Metellus was born in Jacmel, Haiti. After completing his education in Haiti, he worked as a teacher. In 1959 he moved to Paris to escape the Duvalier dictatorship, where he studied linguistics and medicine, specializing in neurology. In 1973 the magazine Les Lettres Nouvelles published his poem "Au pipirite chantant," beginning his career as a poet and writer. Some of Metellus's early poems were also published by Jean-Paul Sartre in his Les Temps Modernes. Metellus' plays include Anacaona, which was produced in Paris at the Thèâtre National de Chaillot by Antoine Vitez.

Metellus published several novels, books of poetry and plays. In 2019, Haun Saussy translated a collection of Metellus's poetry titled When the Pipirite Sings: Selected Poems, which was published by Northwestern University Press. Metellus dedicated his books to his wife, Anne-Marie Cercelet-Métellus.

He died on January 4, 2014.

References

External links
Official website
NU Press catalog

1937 births
2014 deaths
Haitian male poets
Haitian medical writers
20th-century Haitian dramatists and playwrights
Haitian male dramatists and playwrights
Haitian male novelists
Haitian neurologists
20th-century Haitian poets
20th-century Haitian novelists
20th-century male writers